Mario David (1927–1996) was a French film and television actor. A character actor he appeared on screen from the 1950s to the 1990s in supporting roles.

Selected filmography
 Love Is Not a Sin (1952)
 The Tour of the Grand Dukes (1953)
 The Pirates of the Bois de Boulogne (1954)
 More Whiskey for Callaghan (1955)
 Anyone Can Kill Me (1957)
 The Cat (1958)
 Web of Passion (1959)
 Les Bonnes Femmes (1960)
 The Gorillas (1964)
 Le gendarme se marie (1968)
 Leontine (1968)
 A Golden Widow (1969)
 Borsalino (1970)
 The Married Couple of the Year Two (1971)
 Les malheurs d'Alfred (1972)
 Le Magnifique (1973)
 Vogue la galère (1973)
 Flic Story (1975)
 Animal (1977)
 La Zizanie (1978)

References

Bibliography
 Coates-Smith, Michael & McGee, Garry. The Films of Jean Seberg. McFarland, 2014.
 Neupert, Richard John. The End: Narration and Closure in the Cinema. Wayne State University Press, 1995.

External links

1927 births
1996 deaths
French male television actors
French male film actors
People from Charleville-Mézières